Mel B: It's a Scary World is an American reality television series starring English singer Mel B. It debuted on Style Network on September 5, 2010. The show's title is a play on Brown's nickname from when she was part of the Spice Girls, "Scary Spice".

Series background
The series follows the life of British singer/actress/television personality Mel B and her blended family as they deal with Brown's daily life as entertainer, businesswoman, wife and mother. The series is being done in a hybrid docu-comedy type format.

Cast

The family
 Mel B - (Stephen's wife at the time),Phoenix, Angel and Madison's mother, stepmother to Giselle; Well known singer.
 Stephen Belafonte - Melanie's husband/business manager (at the time); father to Madison and Giselle, stepfather to Phoenix and Angel.
 Phoenix Chi Gulzar - Melanie's first daughter.
 Angel Iris Murphy Brown - Melanie's second daughter.
 Giselle Belafonte - Stephen's daughter from a previous relationship and Melanie's step-daughter.

Celebrity guest stars
 Robin Antin
 The Pussycat Dolls (burlesque revue)
 Eddie Murphy
 Damon Elliott
 Ludacris
 Kim Kardashian
 Jay Sean
 Natasha Bedingfield

Critical reception
In an interview with the Futon Critic, Brown notes that what viewers will see is what they really do in real life everyday: "I have a job and my husband has a job so they were just following us around. It's not like we had to make anything up or we had to act. It was actually quite easy, to be honest. The kids thoroughly enjoyed it. It was just a very natural thing to do."

However, Media Life television critic Tom Conroy had a different take on the show: "Anyone who watches "Mel B: It's a Scary World" will wish Mel the best of luck in her quest to add something memorable to her résumé, but this show isn't it."

Episodes

Season 1: 2010

References

External links
 

2010 American television series debuts
2010s American reality television series
2010 American television series endings
Television series based on singers and musicians
English-language television shows
Style Network original programming
Mel B